Pierre Merkel (born 25 May 1989) is a German footballer who plays as a forward for TSV Schott Mainz.

Career
Merkel was born in Bad Kreuznach. After spending the first few seasons of his career in the fifth tier Oberliga Südwest, Merkel joined 2. Bundesliga side Eintracht Braunschweig in 2011. He made his debut in professional football on 23 September 2011, coming on in the 84th minute in an away game against FSV Frankfurt, and scoring the late 1–1 equalizer on a header. His Braunschweig teammates nicknamed him "Angie" after German chancellor Angela Merkel.

In 2013, Merkel's contract in Braunschweig was terminated mutually and he joined Hallescher FC of the 3. Liga on a free transfer. After one season in Halle, Merkel moved to Regionalliga Nord side VfB Oldenburg.

References

External links
 
 

1989 births
Living people
People from Bad Kreuznach
German sportspeople of Ghanaian descent
German footballers
Footballers from Rhineland-Palatinate
Association football forwards
2. Bundesliga players
3. Liga players
Eintracht Braunschweig players
Hallescher FC players
VfB Oldenburg players
Eintracht Braunschweig II players
TSV Steinbach Haiger players
SC Wiedenbrück 2000 players
BSG Chemie Leipzig (1997) players
FSV Wacker 90 Nordhausen players
Berliner AK 07 players
BFV Hassia Bingen players
TSV Schott Mainz players